Andrew de Pendok was the member of Parliament for Gloucester in the 1320s.

References 

Year of birth missing
Year of death missing
Members of the Parliament of England (pre-1707) for Gloucester